The 30th Academy Awards ceremony was held on March 26, 1958, to honor the best films of 1957.

As in the previous year, the blacklisting of certain writers led to anomalies in the writing awards. The Academy Award for Best Screenplay Based on Material from Another Medium was awarded to Pierre Boulle for The Bridge on the River Kwai, despite the fact that he did not speak English, because the actual writers, Carl Foreman and Michael Wilson, were blacklisted at the time and had not received screen credit. Foreman and Wilson have since been acknowledged by the Academy as the true recipients of the award, though Boulle remains listed as an official winner.

Peyton Place tied the record for the most nominations without a win (9) set by The Little Foxes (1941). This record would stand until 1977 when The Turning Point received 11 nominations without a win, which is the record to date (The Color Purple tied the record in 1985).  Peyton Place also set the record for most unsuccessful acting nominations, with five; this record has been tied once, by Tom Jones at the 36th Academy Awards.

This was the first time all five Best Picture nominations were nominated for Best Director. As of the 94th Academy Awards, Designing Woman is the last film to win Best Original Screenplay when nominated solely in that category.

Awards

Nominees were announced on February 18, 1958. Winners are listed first and highlighted with boldface.

Academy Honorary Awards
Charles Brackett "for outstanding service to the Academy".
B. B. Kahane "for distinguished service to the motion picture industry".
Gilbert M. "Broncho Billy" Anderson "motion picture pioneer, for his contributions to the development of motion pictures as entertainment".
the Society of Motion Picture and Television Engineers "for their contributions to the advancement of the motion picture industry".

Jean Hersholt Humanitarian Award
Samuel Goldwyn

Presenters and performers

Presenters
June Allyson (Presenter: Best Special Effects)
Fred Astaire and Dana Wynter (Presenters: Best Foreign Language Film)
Ernest Borgnine and Cyd Charisse (Presenters: Best Documentary)
Joan Collins (Presenter: Cinematography Award)
Gary Cooper (Presenter: Best Picture)
Wendell Corey and Robert Ryan (Presenters: Costume Design Award)
Bette Davis (Presenter: Honorary Awards)
Doris Day and Clark Gable (Presenters: Writing Awards)
Anita Ekberg and Vincent Price (Presenters: Best Scoring)
Cary Grant (Presenter: Best Actor)
Rock Hudson and Jennifer Jones (Presenters: Short Subjects Awards)
Van Johnson and Dorothy Malone (Presenters: Best Sound Recording)
Hope Lange and Ronald Reagan (Presenters: Scientific and Technical Awards)
Sophia Loren (Presenter: Best Director)
Paul Newman and Joanne Woodward (Presenters: Best Film Editing)
Gregory Peck and Eva Marie Saint (Presenters: Best Art Direction)
Anthony Quinn (Presenter: Best Supporting Actress)
Lana Turner (Presenter: Best Supporting Actor)
John Wayne (Presenter: Best Actress)

Performers
Anna Maria Alberghetti, Ann Blyth, Shirley Jones, Tab Hunter, Jimmie Rodgers and Tommy Sands ("April Love" from April Love)
Vic Damone ("An Affair to Remember" from An Affair to Remember)
Kirk Douglas and Burt Lancaster ("It's Great Not to Be Nominated")
Rock Hudson and Mae West ("Baby, It's Cold Outside")
Dean Martin ("All the Way" from The Joker Is Wild)
Johnny Mathis ("Wild Is the Wind" from Wild Is the Wind)
Debbie Reynolds ("Tammy" from Tammy and the Bachelor)

Multiple nominations and awards

These films had multiple nominations:

10 nominations: Sayonara
9 nominations: Peyton Place
8 nominations: The Bridge on the River Kwai
6 nominations: Witness for the Prosecution
4 nominations: An Affair to Remember, Funny Face, Pal Joey and Raintree County
3 nominations: 12 Angry Men, Les Girls and Wild Is the Wind
2 nominations: Gunfight at the O.K. Corral and Heaven Knows, Mr. Allison

The following films received multiple awards.

7 wins: The Bridge on the River Kwai
4 wins: Sayonara

See also
 15th Golden Globe Awards
 1957 in film
 9th Primetime Emmy Awards
 10th Primetime Emmy Awards
 11th British Academy Film Awards
 12th Tony Awards

References

External links
 
 Results at the Internet Movie Database
 1957 Academy Awards at Infoplease

Academy Awards ceremonies
1957 film awards
1957 awards in the United States
1958 in Los Angeles
1958 in American cinema
March 1958 events in the United States